Richard Ryland Kelley (born March 23, 1953) is an American retired basketball player. Kelley played college basketball at Stanford University and was the first round pick (7th pick overall) of the New Orleans Jazz in the 1975 NBA draft. Kelley played eleven NBA seasons.

College career

A center/power forward, a graduate of Woodside High School, Kelley played college basketball for Stanford.

The 7-foot, 235-pound Kelley was drafted as an underclassman in the second round of the 1974 American Basketball Association ABA draft by the New York Nets, but he opted to stay in college for another year.

While in college, Kelley played for the Team USA in the 1974 FIBA World Championship, winning the bronze medal.

In 76 career games at Stanford, under Coach Howard Dallmar, Kelley averaged a double-double of 18.6 points and 12.4 rebounds, shooting 49% from the floor and 78% from the line. He scored 1412 total points, with 944 total rebounds in his three varsity seasons.

NBA career
In 1975, Kelley was drafted by the New Orleans Jazz in the first round of the 1975 NBA draft and by the Memphis Sounds in the second round of the 1975 ABA Draft.

In the NBA Kelley played for the New Orleans/Utah Jazz (1975–79, 1983–85), New Jersey Nets (1979–80), Phoenix Suns (1980–82), Denver Nuggets (1982–83) and Sacramento Kings (1985–86).  His best individual season was with the Jazz in 1978-79, in which he averaged 15.7 points and 12.8 rebounds per game (good for second in the league in rebounding that year), and also established a franchise record with 166 blocked shots.

He helped the Suns win the 1980–81 NBA Pacific Division and the Jazz win the 1983–84 NBA Midwest Division.

He currently ranks 94th on the NBA's career offensive rebounds list (1,872).

In 11 seasons, he played in 814 games and played 17,711 minutes, a 48.8 field goal percentage (2,166 for 4,435), 78.3 free throw percentage (1,867 for 2,384), 5,678 total rebounds (1,872 offensive, 3,806 defensive), 2,092 assists, 694 steals, 749 blocked shots, 2,613 personal fouls and 6,199 points. He averaged 7.6 points and 7.0 rebounds in his 814 career games.

Personal
After retirement, Kelley earned an MBA at Stanford.  He is a co-founder of Search Fund Partners, having started the firm in 2004. He currently serves on the Boards of Directors of San Francisco Legal, Avadyne Health, HemaSource, Verengo, H&R Accounts, Asset Recovery Corporation and Medical Positioning, Inc.

Kelley has been involved in numerous small businesses and start-up companies as an operator, owner, and investor. His varied experience includes: CFO of SCORE! Educational Centers, CEO of San Jose Giants, General Partner of the Stanford Terrace Inn, developer of houses and subdivisions, owner of office buildings, investor in successful tech start-ups (Coinstar, PLX Technology, Corcept Therapeutics). He has also invested in many limited partnerships, including venture funds, and has been involved as a search fund investor since 1994.

Honors
 Kelley was inducted into the Stanford Athletics Hall of Fame in 1985.
 In 2009, Kelley was inducted into the Woodside High School Community Hall of Fame.

References

External links
Career statistics

1953 births
Living people
All-American college men's basketball players
American men's basketball players
Basketball players from California
Centers (basketball)
Denver Nuggets players
Memphis Sounds draft picks
New Jersey Nets players
New Orleans Jazz draft picks
New Orleans Jazz players
People from San Mateo, California
Phoenix Suns players
Power forwards (basketball)
Sacramento Kings players
Stanford Cardinal men's basketball players
United States men's national basketball team players
Utah Jazz players
1974 FIBA World Championship players